Elections to the Labour Party's Shadow Cabinet (more formally, its "Parliamentary Committee") occurred in November 1959. In addition to the 12 members elected, the Leader (Hugh Gaitskell), Deputy Leader (Aneurin Bevan), Labour Chief Whip (Herbert Bowden), Labour Leader in the House of Lords (A. V. Alexander), and Labour Chief Whip in the House of Lords (Lord Faringdon)  were automatically members.

Full results are listed below:

† Multiple candidates tied for position.

References

1959
Labour Party Shadow Cabinet election
Labour Party Shadow Cabinet election